Mendelssohn & Co. was a private bank based in Berlin, Prussia. One of the leading banks in the 19th and early 20th centuries, it was Aryanized by the Nazis because the owners were Jewish.

History
The bank was established in 1795 by Joseph Mendelssohn in Berlin. In 1804, his younger brother Abraham Mendelssohn Bartholdy joined the company. In 1815, they moved into their new headquarters at Jägerstraße 51, thereby laying the foundations of Berlin's financial district. Mendelssohn & Co. remained in that building until its divestiture in 1939.

Mendelssohn quickly rose to prominence among European banks. Starting in the 1850s, they acted as Royal bankers for the Russian Tsar, and from the 1870s dominating the Central European financial market for Russian sovereign bonds and railway bonds. Only the outbreak of World War I in 1914 and the Lenin putsch in 1917 put an end to these close contacts. The Mendelssohn family through the descendants of the founding brothers continued to run the company.

Mendelssohn & Co. survived the financial meltdown of the 1930s comparatively well. Following the death of Franz von Mendelssohn and Paul von Mendelssohn-Bartholdy in 1935, Rudolf Löb was appointed as chairman of the bank, the first non-family member to be chairman.

Aryanization and destruction by the Nazis 
Persecuted by the Nazis, in 1938 Mendelssohn & Co was Aryanized, which was the word used to describe the Nazi policy of transferring assets owned by Jews to "Aryans". Mendelssohn & Co. were forced to hand over their assets to Deutsche Bank and to shut down.

Members of the Mendelssohn family were plundered and forced into exile where several committed suicide.

Notable employees
Rudolf Löb
Fritz Mannheimer
Paul von Mendelssohn-Bartholdy

See also

 Arnhold and S. Bleichroeder

References

Further reading
.

External links
 

Banks established in 1795
1938 disestablishments in Germany
Defunct banks of Germany
Companies based in Berlin
Companies of Prussia
Deutsche Bank
Companies acquired from Jews under Nazi rule